Boudon is a French surname. Notable people with the surname include:

Henri Boudon (1624–1702), French Roman Catholic priest and writer
Raymond Boudon (1934–2013), French sociologist, philosopher, and academic

French-language surnames